This Is Nowhere to be Found is the first full-length recording by Swedish band The Grand Opening. Originally released on Hamburg label Tapete Records.

Track listing
"This Time I Might"
"Don't Drop Off"
"Forever"
"Darkness Save Us"
"Blood on the Moon"
"Secret View"
"Ensillre"
"Get Out"
"So Be It"
"Twist and Turn"

Personnel
John Roger Olsson: vocals, guitar, drums, bass, Fender Rhodes
Jens Pettersson: drums

References

2006 debut albums
The Grand Opening albums
Tapete Records albums